The following are lists of no-hitters in baseball:

Major leagues
 List of Major League Baseball no-hitters
 List of Major League Baseball perfect games
 List of Arizona Diamondbacks no-hitters
 List of Atlanta Braves no-hitters
 List of Baltimore Orioles no-hitters
 List of Boston Red Sox no-hitters
 List of Chicago Cubs no-hitters
 List of Chicago White Sox no-hitters
 List of Cincinnati Reds no-hitters
 List of Cleveland Guardians no-hitters
 List of Colorado Rockies no-hitters
 List of Detroit Tigers no-hitters
 List of Houston Astros no-hitters
 List of Kansas City Royals no-hitters
 List of Los Angeles Angels no-hitters
 List of Los Angeles Dodgers no-hitters
 List of Miami Marlins no-hitters
 List of Milwaukee Brewers no-hitters
 List of Minnesota Twins no-hitters
 List of New York Mets no-hitters
 List of New York Yankees no-hitters
 List of Oakland Athletics no-hitters
 List of Philadelphia Phillies no-hitters
 List of Pittsburgh Pirates no-hitters
 List of San Diego Padres no-hitters
 List of San Francisco Giants no-hitters
 List of Seattle Mariners no-hitters
 List of St. Louis Cardinals no-hitters
 List of Tampa Bay Rays no-hitters
 List of Texas Rangers no-hitters
List of Toronto Blue Jays no-hitters
 List of Washington Nationals no-hitters
 List of Nippon Professional Baseball no-hitters

Minor leagues
 List of American Association no-hitters
 List of International League no-hitters
 List of Pacific Coast League no-hitters
 List of Nashville Sounds no-hitters
 List of Nashville Vols no-hitters